Dhanusha may refer to:
 Bow and arrow
 Dhanusha (unit)
 Dhanusha District, Nepal